The 2015–16 Navy Midshipmen women's basketball team represented the United States Naval Academy during the 2015–16 NCAA Division I women's basketball season. The Midshipmen, led by eighth year head coach Stefanie Pemper, played their home games at Alumni Hall and are members of the Patriot League. They finished the season 15–15, 9–9 in Patriot League play to finish in sixth place. They lost in the quarterfinals of the Patriot League women's tournament to Loyola (MD).

Roster

Schedule

|-
!colspan=9 style="background:#00005D; color:white;"| Non-conference regular season

|-
!colspan=9 style="background:#00005D; color:white;"| Patriot League regular season

|-
!colspan=9 style="background:#00005D; color:white;"| Patriot League Women's Tournament

See also
2015–16 Navy Midshipmen men's basketball team

References

Navy
Navy Midshipmen women's basketball seasons
Navy
Navy